Elizabeth Jordan Carr (born December 28, 1981 at 7:46 am) is the United States' first baby born from the in-vitro fertilization procedure and the 15th in the world. The technique was conducted at Eastern Virginia Medical School in Norfolk under the direction of Doctors Howard Jones and Georgeanna Seegar Jones, who were the first to attempt the process in the United States. She was delivered at Norfolk General Hospital in Virginia by Dr. Mason Andrews weighing 5 pounds 12 ounces (about 2600 g).

The parents of Carr were Judith Carr, a 28-year-old schoolteacher at the time, and her husband, Roger Carr, 30, of Westminster, Massachusetts. Elizabeth's mother was able to get pregnant, but couldn't continue. She experienced three ectopic pregnancies, fertilized eggs growing outside the womb, each ending in a miscarriage, and the doctor was eventually forced to remove her fallopian tubes.

A graduate of Simmons College in Boston, Massachusetts, Carr worked as a journalist for a newspaper in Maine, Central Maine Newspapers in Augusta, which publishes the Kennebec Journal and Morning Sentinel. They are part of the Seattle Times Family group of newspapers. Following her time in Maine, Carr began work at Boston.com, the Boston Globe's online presence.

Carr was named number one Portland Magazine's 2007 list of Maine's Most Intriguing People.

On August 5, 2010, Carr gave birth to her first child, Trevor James Comeau. He was conceived without the assistance of Artificial Reproductive Technology.

See also
Louise Brown
In vitro fertilization

References

External links
Personal blog
Twitter

1981 births
American women journalists
Fertility medicine
In vitro fertilisation
Simmons University alumni
Writers from Norfolk, Virginia
Living people
Journalists from Virginia
21st-century American women